Basinenipalli is a village in Seetharamapuram Mandal of Nellore district in the Indian state of Andhra Pradesh.

References

Villages in Nellore district